Vahan Gevorgyan (born 19 December 1981 in Yerevan) is an Armenian-born Polish footballer.

Successes

3x Polish Cup Winner (2005/06) with Wisła Płock, (2009/10) with Jagiellonia Białystok, (2013/14) with Zawisza Bydgoszcz.
2x Polish SuperCup Winner (2006) with Wisła Płock, (2014) with Zawisza Bydgoszcz.

Career

Club
After his arrival in Poland, he began to play for Wisła Płock in the 1999/2000 season, and has stayed with them ever since.

In February 2011, he joined KSZO Ostrowiec.

In July 2011, he moved to Zawisza Bydgoszcz.

International
He has appeared for Poland once, playing a total of one minute as a substitute against the USA. He has been incorporated into Polish national youth games around Europe and the United States.

National team statistics

Personal life
Gevorgyan's name is variously recorded as Vahan (or Wahan) Geworian, Geworgian, Gevorgian, Gevorian, Geworgyan or Gevorgyan. In season 1999/2000 in Polish newspapers he was incorrectly recorded as Van Gevoryan. In his passport, his name is 'Vahan Gevorgyan'. He was stateless until 2003, when he was granted Polish citizenship.

References

External links
 
  

1981 births
Living people
Footballers from Yerevan
Polish footballers
Armenian footballers
Poland international footballers
Wisła Płock players
Jagiellonia Białystok players
ŁKS Łódź players
KSZO Ostrowiec Świętokrzyski players
Zawisza Bydgoszcz players
Ekstraklasa players
Armenian expatriate footballers
Armenian expatriate sportspeople in Poland
Polish people of Armenian descent
Naturalized citizens of Poland
Association football midfielders
Armenian emigrants to Poland